The 1899 Victorian Football Association season was the 23rd season of the Australian rules football competition. The premiership was won by the Footscray Football Club; it was the second premiership in the club's history, and the second in a sequence of three premierships won consecutively from 1898 to 1900.

Association membership 
The size of the association increased from six teams to eight in 1899, with two senior clubs joining the association: Prahran and West Melbourne. West Melbourne was invited to join the association as a senior club after having previously competed in the Victorian Junior Football Association; it accepted the invitation, but with no ground of suitable standard available in its district, West Melbourne shared tenancy of the North Melbourne Recreation Reserve as a venue for home matches. Prahran was newly formed as a senior club in 1899; it was the second time that Prahran had been represented by a senior club in the VFA, after a previous unrelated Prahran club had competed from 1886 to 1887 before merging with neighbouring . The new club played its matches at the Hawksburn Cricket Ground (Toorak Park) in Armadale.

Ladder 
The premiership was decided on the basis of the best record across twenty-one rostered matches, with each club playing the others three times. For the first time, each team had a calculated 'average' (known today as 'percentage'), calculated as the ratio of points scored to points conceded; this was used to break ties in the final placings.

Notable events 

External links 
 Victorian Football Association/Victorian Football League history (1877–2008)
 List of VFA premiers
 History of Australian rules football in Victoria (1853–1900)

References 

Victorian Football League seasons
VFL